The Carnival of Viareggio is a carnival event annually held in the Tuscan city of Viareggio, in Italy. It is considered amongst the most renowned carnival celebrations in both Italy and Europe.

Overview
Its main characteristic is given by the parade of floats and masks, usually made of paper-pulp, depicting caricatures of popular people, such as politicians, showmen and sportsmen; the parade is held on the Viareggio avenue located alongside the local beach. Every year, the Carnevale di Viareggio attracts more than 500,000 spectators.

Carnival celebrations are scheduled every weekend night in the city's different quarters or Rioni with the best known bars, restaurants, discos and hotels in Versilia hosting all-night colourful masked parties. Additionally, during the four-week celebration, plays in vernacular language are staged around the city.
What makes the Carnevale di Viareggio one of a kind are its papier-mâché gargantuan allegorical floats with the largest ones towering 70 feet or 20 meters over the crowds and weighing about 40 tons. 
The Carnival Giant Float Parades take place along a 2 kilometre ring set aside Viareggio’s Liberty-era boardwalk, best known as La Passeggiata.

History
The first Viareggio carnival parade was held in 1873, when some wealthy middle-class men decided to organize a parade of floats adorned with flowers; a number of local citizens, as a sign of protest, then decided to put on masks in order to show their refusal of high taxes they were forced to pay.  The first float to win the parade, in 1883, was named I Quattro Mori (The Four Moors), an accurately representation of the homonymous Livorno statue.  The official mascot of the Viareggio carnival is Burlamacco, first depicted in 1931 by Uberto Bonetti. Since 2001, all the floats are built in an apposite seat, called Cittadella del Carnevale (Carnival Citadel), located on the northern side of the Viareggio city territory.

The carnival stopped being held during the First World War and only resumed in 1921. It stopped again during the Second World War and resumed in 1946. From that point on, it grew in popularity.

In 1925, for the very first time, local sculptor Antonio d'Arliano employed the paper mould technique on iron and wood scaffolding, thus changing forever the way the structure of Carnival floats would be made. Since then, the use of papier-mâché has become an integral element in the construction of these giant allegorical floats.

In 2019, the Carnival parade gained international attention for a float depicting then-U.S. President Donald Trump dressed as the Emperor from Warhammer 40,000. Many floats had satirized Trump, Vladimir Putin and Kim Jong-Un at previous parades.

Cittadella
The impressive complex of the Cittadella del Carnevale di Viareggio was inaugurated in 2001 and is the largest and most important Italian thematic center dedicated to carnival floats and masks. It houses sixteen large hangars and workshops where the giant floats are built, a laboratory where the art of papier-mâché is taught, three museum areas and a historical photo and film archive and documentation center. At the Citadel of the Carnevale di Viareggio it is possible to visit the Papier Mâché Museum where the breathtaking floats are stored and the Museum of the Carnival that illustrates the over 100-year old history of the Carnevale through original documents, photographs, sketches, posters and models.

Mascot

Burlamacco is the clown-like figure which presides over the carnival in the Tuscan town of Viareggio, and is the town's mascot.  Burlamacco was first depicted in 1931 by Uberto Bonetti; A competition had been held for the design of the mascot and his was the winning entry. He had chosen the red and white of the outfit from the traditional colours of the umbrellas on the beach at Viareggio and the name came 8 years later; it is derived from the Burlamacca river. 
To this day Burlamacco remains a feature of the carnival and there is a statue of him all the year round on the Lungomare in Viareggio.

References

External links

 Official website

Viareggio
Viareggio
Tourist attractions in Tuscany